José María Iglesias Inzáurraga (January 5, 1823 – December 17, 1891) was a Mexican lawyer, professor, journalist and liberal politician. He is known as author of the Iglesias law, an anticlerical law regulating ecclesiastical fees and aimed at preventing the impoverishment of the Mexican peasantry. 

From October 31, 1876 to January 23, 1877, as revolts against the presidency of Sebastian Lerdo de Tejada broke out, he claimed the interim presidency of Mexico. However, he was never undisputed president. President Lerdo would be overthrown and Porfirio Diaz would emerge as the victor in the ensuing power struggles, after which Iglesias went into exile to the United States.

Early life
José María Iglesias was born into a wealthy family in Mexico City, but when he was 12 his father died. Five years later, his mother also died. His maternal uncle Manuel Inzáurraga took responsibility for his education. He studied for the law Colegio Gregoriano in Mexico City, graduating with good marks, and was admitted to the bar in 1844.

Career

Early positions
He became a professor of jurisprudence at the College of San Gregorio. He also collaborated on a newspaper opposed to the regime of Antonio López de Santa Anna. He became a city councilman in Mexico City in 1846, and after the U.S. invasion of that year, he was named to the Supreme Military Tribunal. At the end of the war, he took an important position in the Treasury Department in the government of Mariano Arista.

Political career
In 1852, Iglesias was elected to Congress, where he became known for his eloquence and his knowledge of constitutional law. In 1856, he was named chief clerk of the Treasury Department under President Ignacio Comonfort and later secretary of justice (January to May 1857). In the latter position, he was responsible for drafting the law that barred the Church from holding landed property. From May until September 1857, he was secretary of the treasury. On 16 September 1857, he was elected, by popular vote, judge of the supreme court. Throughout the War of the Reform (1857–61), he was a strong defender of the Liberal cause in the press.

In Juárez's cabinet
With the fall of Puebla to the French on May 17, 1863, President Benito Juárez was forced to abandon Mexico City. Iglesias, a Liberal and a constitutionalist, accompanied him. In September, Juárez named him secretary of justice, a position he continued to hold until the Republican government returned to the capital in 1867 after the expulsion of Emperor Maximilian. During this period, he accompanied Juárez and the rest of the Republican government as they moved from place to place to avoid capture by the Imperialists. Part of this time, he was also secretary of the treasury.

After the return to Mexico City, Iglesias was again elected to Congress. In 1867, he became president of the Chamber of Deputies. From September 1868 until October 1869, he was secretary of the interior. Thereafter, he was secretary of justice again.

As interim president
In 1871, he retired to private life for reasons of health. He returned to public service the next year, and in July 1873 he was elected president of the Supreme Court. (Juárez had died in 1872 and Sebastián Lerdo de Tejada had succeeded him as president.) When Congress declared President Lerdo (also a Liberal and supporter of Juárez) re-elected on September 26, 1876, Iglesias, in his judicial capacity, declared the election illegal because of fraud and the constitutional succession interrupted. In the absence of a constitutional president, the constitution specified that executive power should be exercised by the president of the Supreme Court, and as such, Iglesias claimed the presidency. At the same time, General Porfirio Díaz proclaimed the Plan de Tuxtepec and rose against Lerdo.

Some of Iglesias's supporters were arrested by Lerdo de Tejada, and Iglesias was forced to flee the capital. He went to Guanajuato, where he was recognized as president of the Republic by Governor Florencio Antillón, General García de la Cadena, and the military commander of Jalisco, General Ceballos. In Salamanca, he issued a manifesto announcing his assumption of the government. He also named a cabinet. By December, the states of Guanajuato, Querétaro, Aguascalientes, Jalisco and San Luis Potosí had recognized him as president.

Meanwhile, Lerdo de Tejada was forced to abandon the capital after losing the Battle of Tecoac (Puebla) to General Porfirio Díaz. Díaz and Iglesias began negotiations, but when these broke down over the latter's refusal to recognize the Plan de Tuxtepec, Díaz marched against him. Iglesias fled to Guadalajara, where he installed his government on January 2, 1877. His forces under Antillón were defeated at Los Adobes, and he fled with his cabinet and General Ceballos to Manzanillo, Colima. On January 16, he sailed for the United States.

Later life
In New York, he wrote La Cuestión Presidencial de 1876, a defense of his claims. He returned to Mexico in 1878 without problems. He was offered several important positions by the government, but he declined. He was editor-in-chief of various journals, and published Apuntes para la historia de la guerra entre Méjico y los Estados Unidos (Mexico, 1852), and Revistas Históricas sobre la Intervención Francesa (1870). His autobiography was published in 1893.

Personal life and death
He died in Tacubaya, Mexico City on December 17, 1891. In 1987 President Miguel de la Madrid ordered that Iglesias' remains be transferred to the Rotonda de las Personas Ilustres (Rotunda of Illustrious People).

See also

List of presidents of Mexico

Further reading
 García Puron, Manuel, México y sus gobernantes, v. 2. Mexico City: Joaquín Porrúa, 1984.
 Orozco Linares, Fernando, Gobernantes de México. Mexico City: Panorama Editorial, 1985, .

References

External links
 Short biography

Presidents of Mexico
1823 births
1891 deaths
19th-century Mexican people
1870s in Mexico
Second French intervention in Mexico
Mexican people of Basque descent
Politicians from Mexico City
Liberalism in Mexico
Members of the Chamber of Deputies (Mexico)
Presidents of the Chamber of Deputies (Mexico)